is a retired Japanese tennis player who competed on the WTA Tour.  She attained a career-best ranking of #24 in the world in October 1995.  That year, she reached the third round of the Australian Open, Wimbledon, and the U.S. Open.

WTA finals

Doubles (0–2)

ITF finals

Singles (1–3)

Doubles (0–3)

External links
 
 

1971 births
Japanese female tennis players
Living people
Sportspeople from Yokohama